The Men's keirin event of the 2008 UCI Track Cycling World Championships was held on 29 March 2008.

Results

Round 1

Round 1 repechage

Round 2

Finals

References

External links
 Full results at Tissottiming.com

Men's keirin
UCI Track Cycling World Championships – Men's keirin